Tellin is a municipality of Wallonia located in the province of Luxembourg, Belgium, in the Ardennes. 

On 1 January 2007 the municipality, which covers 56.64 km², had 2,386 inhabitants, giving a population density of 42.1 inhabitants per km².

The municipality consists of the following districts: Bure, Grupont, Resteigne, and Tellin.

Sights
The Bell and Carillon Museum was housed in a former stagecoach inn, from 1992 to 2013. The museum showed the history of the foundry, manufacturing, professional secrets and the work of the bell-founders. In addition, there was a unique set of weather-vanes and clocks.

See also
 List of protected heritage sites in Tellin

References

External links
 

 
Municipalities of Luxembourg (Belgium)